Gündüzlü can refer to:

 Gündüzlü, İnegöl
 Gündüzlü, Kozluk